David Kealohalani Nuuhiwa III (more commonly known as David Nuuhiwa) is a Hawaiian surfer.

Life 
Nuuhiwa was born in 1948 in Honolulu, Hawaii, the son of a Waikiki beachboy and martial arts instructor, and began surfing at age five, one year after his mother died.
He moved to California in 1961 with his father David Nuuhiwa II.

David Nuuhiwa is widely known for his soulful noseriding. Often perched at the tip of his board for 20 seconds or more. Nuuhiwa's smooth and fluid style established him winning the May 10th 1966 international championship in San Diego.

Nuuhiwa continued to win contests following the shortboard era, such as the 1971 U.S. Surfing Championships. By this time Nuuhiwa had transitioned from his longboards to shortboards, favoring twin-fin fishes. He continued to win competitions and make projects, most notably surfing in Rainbow Bridge, a film starring Jimi Hendrix.
Nuuhiwa later starred in Five Summer Stories.

References

External links
Interview with David Nuuhiwa in Liquid Salt Magazine 
Encyclopedia of Surfing entry on David Nuuhiwa

American surfers
Living people
1948 births
People from Oahu
Sportspeople from Huntington Beach, California
Sportspeople from Hawaii